Nekhayevka is a rural locality (a khutor) and the administrative center of Klimenkovskoye Rural Settlement, Veydelevsky District, Belgorod Oblast, Russia. The population was 153 as of 2010. There are 4 streets.

Geography 
Nekhayevka is located 11 km northwest of Veydelevka (the district's administrative centre) by road. Roshchino is the nearest rural locality.

References 

Rural localities in Veydelevsky District